Danny Agostinho Henriques (born 29 July 1997) is a Portuguese professional footballer who plays as a central defender for Liga I club FC U Craiova 1948.

Club career
Henriques was born in Rotterdam in the Netherlands to Portuguese parents. He played youth football with SBV Excelsior and SC Cambuur, before moving to Portugal with U.D. Vilafranquense in the third division.

On 13 June 2018, Henriques signed a three-year contract with Belenenses SAD, being initially assigned to the under-23 team. He made his Primeira Liga debut on 8 February 2020, coming on as an early substitute for the injured Nuno Coelho in a 0–2 home loss against C.D. Santa Clara. He scored his first goal the following weekend, opening the 2–1 away win over Boavista F.C. and later being sent off for two yellow cards.

References

External links

1997 births
Living people
Dutch people of Portuguese descent
Dutch footballers
Portuguese footballers
Footballers from Rotterdam
Association football defenders
Primeira Liga players
Liga Portugal 2 players
Campeonato de Portugal (league) players
U.D. Vilafranquense players
Belenenses SAD players
Liga I players
FC U Craiova 1948 players
Dutch expatriate footballers
Portuguese expatriate footballers
Expatriate footballers in Romania
Dutch expatriate sportspeople in Romania
Portuguese expatriate sportspeople in Romania